The Avenue Theater, located at 417 E. 17th Avenue in Downtown Denver, Colorado has been a producing comedies, musicals, and plays as well as improvisational comedy for  years. It is home to the World Humor Organization (WHO) and Chicken Lips Entertainment

History

Early years
Robert Wells founded the Avenue Theater in 1985. At that time the theater was located at East 17th & Vine, 17 blocks east of the current location. Wells ran the theater for its first seven years.

Changing Hands
In 1992, John Ashton became the owner. He ran it for 9 years until, in 2001, the original Avenue Theater was closed. After its closing, Ashton spent the next two years finding a location and rebuilding the Avenue Theater. In spring of 2003, Ashton re-opened the Avenue Theater with business partner Robert Roehl.

In 2005, the pair sold the theater back to original owner Robert Wells and his business partner, Dave Johnson, who turned the theater into a non-profit, 501(c)(3). In 2011, they hired a new Director of Operations, Colin Elliott. Late in 2012, Johnson stepped down as executive director, and Nuri Heckler was appointed. These three, along with volunteers, interns, staff members, and artistic contributors, maintain the artistic mission of the theater.

Radio Avenue
Every month, Wells and Johnson write a comical radio show entitled Radio Avenue. It is broadcast on KGNU on the first Monday of each month at 8:00 pm (Mountain Time) and is recorded the day before during a live performance at the Avenue. Because of its improv comedy nature, Radio Avenue is recorded live to a free audience.

List of Shows

2005
Parallel Lives
The Rocky Horror Show
The Fourth Wall
The Syringa Tree
Tribal Tales Of Africa
Murder Most Fowl

2006
The Smell of the Kill
Destination Dinosaurs
Beyond Therapy
Tales Of An Englishman (Produced by A.C.E. Comedy)
The A.C.E. Show (Co-produced by A.C.E. Comedy & Avenue Theater)
Miscast (Produced by Next Stage Theatre Company)
Some Unfortunate Hour (Produced by The Other Theatre Company)
Denver Improv Festival (Produced by The GroupMind Foundation)
BFE, The Town That Christmas Forgot (Co-produced by Rattlebrain Theater & Avenue Theater)
Murder Most Fowl

2007
Murder Most Fowl
Destination Dinosaurs
The Man Himself/Conviction (Co-produced by Ami Dayan & Avenue Theater)
Right On America! (Produced by Elgin Kelley)
Girls Only (Co-produced by A.C.E. Comedy & Avenue Theater)
Ben Franklin (Produced by Venture West)
Dog Sees God
I Love You, You're Perfect, Now Change
When Animals Improv
The Bible: The Complete Word Of God (Abridged)
Denver Improv Festival (Produced by The GroupMind Foundation)

2008
Girls Only (Co-produced by A.C.E. Comedy & Avenue Theater)
Oleanna
Almost Denver: The Songs and Failures of Jim Aurora
Free Gas: Chicken Lips Gives It To America

2009
That Woman Show
Vagina Monologues
60 Minutes: The Musical
Die! Mommy Die!
Santa's Big Red Sack
What the Dickens?!

2010
Secrets of a Soccer Mom
The Booty Guard
Hedwig and the Angry Inch
The Love List
VOX Phamalia: Triage
Santa's Big Red Sack

2011
The Goode Body
The B-Team
Hedwig and the Angry Inch
Breach
Completely Hollywood (Abridged)
VOX Phamalia: Quadrapalooza
Rattlebrain (Special Event, Original One-Man Sketch Comedy Show)
Santa's Big Red Sack

2012
Santa's Big Red Sack
Scriptprov
Murder Most Fowl
Love Child
Dave Shirley's Rattlebrain
String of Pearls

Awards

2006 Denver Post Ovation Awards (6 Nominations, 2 Wins)
Best Actor in a Children's Play: Chris Boeckx (Destination Dinosaurs) - WINNER
Best Children's Play: Destination Dinosaurs
Best Sound Design: Dave Johnson (Beyond Therapy)
Best Actress in a Comic Role: Megan Van DeHay (The Smell of the Kill)
Best Actor in a Comic Role:  Kevin Hart (Beyond Therapy)
Special Achievement Video Design: Brian Freeland (Destination Dinosaurs) - WINNER

2006 Marlowe Awards (10 Wins)
Best Production of a Play, Comedy: Beyond Therapy - WINNER
Best Director, Comedy: Bob Wells (Beyond Therapy) - WINNER
Best Actor, Comedy: Kevin Hart (Beyond Therapy) - WINNER
Best Actress, Comedy: Megan Van DeHay (The Smell of the Kill) - WINNER
Best Supporting Actor, Comedy: Josh Hartwell (Beyond Therapy) - WINNER
Best Supporting Actress, Comedy: LuAnn Buckstein (Beyond Therapy) - WINNER
Best Actor, Children's Show: Chris Boeckx (Destination Dinosaurs) - WINNER
Best Children's Show: Destination Dinosaurs - WINNER
Best Videography: Brian Freeland (Destination Dinosaurs) - WINNER
Best New Musical: BFE: The Town Christmas Forgot - WINNER

See also
 Radio Avenue
 Chicken Lips
 World Humor Organization

References

External links
Official Avenue Theater Website

Theatres in Denver